Telenius is a surname. Notable people with the surname include:

Seppo Telenius (born 1954), Finnish writer and historian
Vera Telenius (1912–1991), Finnish singer